is a 2008 animated superhero anthology film based on the DC Comics superhero of the same name. The film consists of six segments produced by Japanese animation studios Studio 4°C, Madhouse, Bee Train and Production I.G in association with DC Comics and Warner Bros. Animation. Set between Batman Begins and The Dark Knight, the segments in the film depict Batman battling against the mob of Gotham City, as well as other villains. Although stated to take place within The Dark Knight trilogy, the producers have acknowledged that the plot from the anthology is not necessarily integral to the main story told within the films. The shorts are written by Josh Olson, David S. Goyer, Brian Azzarello, Greg Rucka, Jordan Goldberg and Alan Burnett. Although all use Japanese anime art styles, each segment has its own writing and artistic style, similar to other DC Universe works and The Animatrix; however, some segments are connected, giving it the nickname, "The Batimatrix". All six segments of the anthology film star Kevin Conroy, reprising his voice role as Batman from the DC Animated Universe.

It is the third film of the DC Universe Animated Original Movies released by Warner Premiere and Warner Bros. Animation; with the first two releases being Superman: Doomsday and Justice League: The New Frontier. It is rated PG-13 by the MPAA for "stylized violence, including some bloody images". While Batman: Gotham Knight was advertised as the "first animated Batman movie to be rated PG-13", the unedited version of Batman Beyond: Return of the Joker (2000) is actually the first such film. This film is also notable for being the first DC Original Animated movie to have a connection with another Batman medium. While Superman: Doomsday and Justice League: The New Frontier have been released in the United Kingdom with a 12 rating, Batman: Gotham Knight was instead released with a 15 rating for "images of bloody violence and injury". The film had its television premiere on Cartoon Network on October 4, 2008 with a TV-14-V rating and an exclusive parental warning after each commercial break, with a few of the more graphic scenes cut. Over a decade later, it once again aired on the network on its nighttime programming block Adult Swim's Toonami block on August 22, 2020, in partnership with DC FanDome.

Films set in Chicago

Segments
Batman: Gotham Knight is split into six segments:

Have I Got a Story for You (Studio 4°C)
Have I Got a Story for You was written by Josh Olson and animated by Studio 4°C.

A street kid meets with his three friends at a skate park, to which all three of them claim to have seen Batman earlier that day. Batman's battle with the Man in Black, a high-tech criminal, is told in reverse chronological order with three very different interpretations of Batman's form and abilities (in the style of the 1950 film Rashomon): one describes him as a living shadow that can melt away and reappear at will (similar to the Vampire Batman from the Batman & Dracula trilogy); another describes him as a half-human, half-bat creature (similar to the Man-Bat); and lastly, one describes him as a combat robot that can leap tall buildings in a single bound. At the end, Batman pursues the Man in Black to the skate park and captures him with the help of the fourth street kid. The fourth kid is able to see what Batman truly is after seeing him sustain injuries by a grenade blast from the battle: a human warrior in a costume. He then proceeds to tell his experience about seeing Batman to his friends after Batman disappears.

Note: Though the film credits give "story by" acknowledgment to first-time writer Jordan Goldberg, Josh Olson acknowledged it was actually based on a very similar story by Frank Robbins called "The Batman Nobody Knows". The story was first printed in Batman #250 in 1973, and subsequently adapted as "Legends of the Dark Knight" in The New Batman Adventures. According to Olson: "The first time it's stealing, the second time it's borrowing, the third time you're creating a genre". The three different versions of the Man in Black have many similarities to other members of Batman's rogues gallery, though they all resemble a member of the League of Shadows. The first story features a tech-wielding villain who has teeth similar to Killer Croc, the second uses a jetpack (reminiscent of the Firefly), and the third has similarities to the villain Deadshot. Also, the Batman of the second encounter is very similar to the villain Man-Bat. When the Man in Black is seen by all the teenagers, he has no identifiable characteristics. Lastly, the story is told backwards, with the kid who claims he saw Batman most recently going first, ending with the kid who saw him first.

Voice cast
 Kevin Conroy as Bruce Wayne / Batman
 Jason Marsden as Cop
 Scott Menville as B-Devil
 George Newbern as Jacob Feely / Man in Black
 Corey Padnos as Porkchop
 Crystal Scales as Meesh
 Alanna Ubach as Dander
 Hynden Walch as Woman

Crossfire (Production I.G)
Crossfire was written by Greg Rucka and animated by Production I.G.

Crispus Allen and Anna Ramirez are partners and members of the Major Crimes Unit that have been hand-picked by Lieutenant James Gordon. The two are assigned to take the recently captured Man in Black (who was captured previously on Have I Got A Story For You), revealed to be Jacob Feely, an escaped inmate from Arkham Asylum with an expertise in advanced electronics and explosives back to Arkham Asylum (which most of the Narrows has been converted into following the events in Batman Begins). On their way, they argue over whether Batman can be trusted, with Allen saying that they are just running errands for a vigilante, while Ramirez replies that Batman has changed Gotham for the better. As they are heading back, Allen declares his intention to leave the MCU and Ramirez pulls into a vacant lot to confront Allen. However, the two get caught in a very large gunfight between gangs, the Russian Mob and Sal Maroni's gang. Maroni's men are gunned down and Maroni takes refuge behind Allen and Ramirez's patrol car, which the Russian subsequently destroys with a rocket launcher. Ramirez and Maroni manage to get clear in time, while Allen is rescued by Batman who proceeds to take out the Russian and his men. Sal Maroni then threatens to kill Ramirez, but he is dispatched by Batman. Batman recognizes Allen and Ramirez as Gordon's hand-picked officers and remarks that Gordon is a good judge of character, then disappears.

Voice cast
 Kevin Conroy as Bruce Wayne / Batman
 Jim Meskimen as James Gordon
 Ana Ortiz as Anna Ramirez
 Corey Burton as Yuri Dimitrov
 Gary Dourdan as Crispus Allen
 Jason Marsden as Doctor
 Scott Menville as Cop
 Pat Musick as News Anchor
 Rob Paulsen as Sal Maroni
 Andrea Romano as Dispatcher

Field Test (Bee Train)
Field Test was written by Jordan Goldberg and animated by Bee Train.

An accident involving a new WayneCom satellite's gyroscopic electromagnetic guidance system gives Lucius Fox an idea to create a device with the satellite's gyro with an advanced sound sensor that will electromagnetically deflect small-arms fire. Bruce Wayne takes the device and attends a charity golf tournament being held by land developer Ronald Marshall, with whom he discusses the mysterious death of a community activist named Teresa Williams, who had opposed some of Marshall's plans. During the tournament, Wayne secretly takes Marshall's PDA device. Later that night as Batman, he hijacks a boat owned by Sal Maroni and drives it alongside a boat owned by the Russian Mob's leader, the Russian, and proceeds to attack both gangs at once with assistance from his new device. He attempts to force a truce between the two gang leaders until he can get evidence against them and that Sal Maroni and the Russian can then argue who gets the top bunk at Blackgate Penitentiary. The discussion is disrupted when one of Maroni's men fires at him. The bullet deflects and instead hits one of the Russian's men. Distressed, Batman takes the injured man to the hospital. Later, he returns the device to Fox, stating: "...It works too well: I'm willing to put my life on the line to do what I have to. But it has to be mine, no one else's."

Voice cast
 Kevin Conroy as Bruce Wayne / Batman
 Corey Burton as Yuri Dimitrov, Ronald Marshall
 Will Friedle as Anton
 George Newbern as Guido
 Rob Paulsen as Sal Maroni
 Kevin Michael Richardson as Lucius Fox

In Darkness Dwells (Madhouse)
In Darkness Dwells, was written by David S. Goyer (who also wrote for all three films) and animated by Madhouse.

The police respond to a riot in a cathedral where Cardinal O'Fallon was giving a sermon. According to eyewitness testimony, the Cardinal was abducted by a large  monster and taken down into the crypts below the cathedral. Lieutenant Gordon, Crispus Allen and Anna Ramirez investigate. Gordon has a brief conversation with Batman, who agrees with Gordon's theory that the Scarecrow's fear toxin is behind the riot, as the doctor has been at large since the riot at the Narrows (during the events of Batman Begins). Batman gives Gordon an earpiece that will allow them to stay in contact and descends below ground, trying to find Cardinal O'Fallon and his abductor. A homeless man living in an abandoned subway station identifies the abductor as Killer Croc. Batman and Gordon briefly discuss the villain's past, but are cut off when Killer Croc ambushes Batman. During the fight, Batman discovers Croc is under the influence of the Scarecrow's fear toxin. Batman defeats him, but not before sustaining a bite that transfers some of the toxin to him. He then finds Cardinal O'Fallon being put on trial and sentenced to death by the Scarecrow (who is unhappy with O'Fallon's efforts to help the homeless). Batman leaps in to defend the Cardinal. Using the methane already present in the room, he sparks an explosion that destroys several water pipes, flooding the area and allowing him to escape with the Cardinal. While the Scarecrow escapes, Gordon appears in a helicopter to retrieve the Cardinal. Gordon offers to help Batman, but Batman refuses, saying: "Maybe next time."

Voice cast
 Kevin Conroy as Bruce Wayne / Batman
 Gary Dourdan as Crispus Allen
 Jim Meskimen as James Gordon
 Ana Ortiz as Anna Ramirez
 Corey Burton as Dr. Jonathan Crane / The Scarecrow
 Will Friedle as Cultist
 Brian George as O'Fallon
 George Newbern as Man
 Rob Paulsen as Mole Man

Working Through Pain (Studio 4°C)
Working Through Pain was written by Brian Azzarello and animated by Studio 4°C.

Taking place after In Darkness Dwells, Batman is shot in the stomach by a man hallucinating in the sewers of Gotham. Severely injured, Batman cauterizes the wound and attempts to get out from underground, reflecting on his experiences with managing pain as he does so (before the events of Batman Begins). First, he remembers volunteering with a relief effort in the Middle East and assisting a doctor in performing surgery without anesthesia. Next, he reflects on the lessons he learned from a woman named Cassandra who was cast out of her community for disguising herself as a boy in an attempt to become a fakir. Over several months, she teaches him to minimize his pain to the point where he can control it, sleeping on a bed of needles or standing on hot coals without reacting. One night, several young men appear to harass Cassandra, who takes their blows without seeming to feel them. Bruce steps in to defend her, not only demonstrating his ability to withstand their attacks, but defeating them all with his martial arts skills. Cassandra then tells him to leave, saying that he has learned what he came to learn. She then comments on how Bruce's pain was beyond her or possibly even his ability to handle, but how it also appeared to be leading him down a path he desired. Back in the present, Batman ends up in a gutter where he discovers a cache of guns buried in the garbage. Alfred then arrives to assist him and tells Batman to reach out his hand so he can pull him out of the gutter but Batman, whose arms are full of guns, replies that he cannot.

Voice cast
 Kevin Conroy as Bruce Wayne / Batman
 David McCallum as Alfred Pennyworth
 Will Friedle as Youth 1
 Brian George as Arman, Scruffy Man
 Jason Marsden as Youth 2
 Parminder Nagra as Cassandra
 George Newbern as Youth 3
 Rob Paulsen as Youth 4
 Kevin Michael Richardson as Avery, Wounded Man
 Hynden Walch as Young Cassandra

Deadshot (Madhouse)
Deadshot was written by Alan Burnett and animated by Madhouse.

Bruce Wayne has a flashback to the murder of his parents. In his penthouse, he examines the firearms he took from the underground tunnel's gutter (during the events of Working Through Pain) which he intends to turn in to the police. Wayne admits to Alfred that even though he vowed never to use them in the memory of his parents, he can still understand the temptation to use one. Meanwhile, in another city, a prodigious assassin known as Deadshot carries out an assassination on Mayor Manning with a spectacularly difficult shot from a moving ferris wheel literally miles away from the man and returns to his tropical base. There, one of his associates hires him to carry out a hit in Gotham. It is revealed that the Russian has put out a hit on Lieutenant Gordon and Batman is called in to protect him. Batman gives Crispus Allen Ronald Marshall's handheld PDA device (which he stole as Bruce Wayne in Field Test), containing a link to encrypted e-mails proving that Ronald Marshall hired Deadshot in the past. He then follows Gordon's motorcade, with Alfred providing satellite-imagery assistance using the new WayneCom satellites. Deadshot attempts to shoot Gordon from a moving train, but Batman deflects the bullet. Deadshot then gleefully reveals that Batman was his real target the entire time and that the threat against Gordon was merely a ruse to draw him out. He opens fire as the train enters a tunnel and as Batman attempts to charge at Deadshot, he gets shot and falls off the train. Deadshot advances to where he saw Batman fall while gloating about shooting Batman, but is suddenly ambushed and disarmed from behind by Batman. Now terrified, Deadshot confesses that he was hired by the Russians to kill Batman and tries to talk Batman out of killing him since he was "only doing his job." Infuriated with Deadshot's cowardice, Batman knocks him out and Deadshot and Ronald Marshall are later arrested afterwards. Later, Wayne confides to Alfred about how similar the fight in the tunnel seemed to the night his parents were murdered and comments that "I've been trying to stop those two bullets all my life." He expresses discouragement and Alfred agrees, but then adds that he thinks Bruce has a higher purpose. The film ends with Bruce looking up at the sky and seeing the Bat-Signal.

Voice cast
 Kevin Conroy as Bruce Wayne / Batman
 Hynden Walch as Young Bruce Wayne, Female Campaign Worker
 Gary Dourdan as Crispus Allen
 Jim Meskimen as James Gordon, Floyd Lawton / Deadshot
 David McCallum as Alfred Pennyworth
 Jason Marsden as Thomas Wayne, Doctor
 Pat Musick as News Anchor
 Kevin Michael Richardson as Bulky Man
 Andrea Romano as Martha Wayne

Soundtrack

The soundtrack for Batman: Gotham Knight was released on July 29, 2008 by La La Land Records. The music for Gotham Knight, while being an original score, contains samples of earlier and notable Batman themes from past media. For example, in "Crossfire", when Batman saves Crispus Allen from an explosion by launching him onto a rooftop, his appearance (for the first time in the short) is marked by the distinctive choral Batman theme introduced in Danny Elfman's 1989 score to the film Batman. The track list is as follows.

Reception
Three months prior to the release, the first review for Batman: Gotham Knight appeared on The World's Finest. The review gave the movie a generally favorable response, stating, "it's something new and entirely fresh for the Dark Knight and that alone is worth checking out if you're a DC Animation fan." The World's Finest also labeled its advice as "Recommended".

The film sold over 337,000 copies on DVD in the United States, and earned $9,753,273 from domestic home video sales.

Home video
Batman: Gotham Knight was released on both single- and two-disc DVD editions, and in a double pack with the two-disc version of Batman Begins, as well as a Blu-ray version on July 8, 2008.

The special features on the single-disc edition contain an audio commentary of the film by Gregory Noveck, Dennis O'Neil and Kevin Conroy, as well as a sneak peek at the next movie of the DC Universe Animated Original Movies line: Wonder Woman. It is also including trailers and advertisements of The Dark Knight, Journey to the Center of the Earth, Lego Batman and Popeye the Sailor 1938–1940 (vol. 2). The Target edition also includes the first two episodes of Batman Beyond. The Blockbuster Inc. edition comes with a second disc with a digital copy of the Batman: Year One graphic novel (Batman #404–407).

The two-disc and Blu-ray editions of the film contain the aforementioned special features as well as a documentary titled Batman and Me: The Bob Kane Story, a featurette exploring Batman and the Gotham villains he faces titled A Mirror for the Bat, as well as four episodes from Batman: The Animated Series (see below), presented by Bruce Timm. Walmart and Target both released store exclusive versions of the single-disc edition of the film, both with different box covers/sleeves. Walmart's is a holographic cover/sleeve and Target's is a holographic cover/sleeve that can be hidden or shown. Certain Best Buy stores released a special edition for the two-disc edition which came in a Steelbook case and came with a mini-encyclopedia to the characters in the movie as well as Batman's weapons and vehicles and a coupon for $3.00 off concessions when the buyer sees The Dark Knight.

The four episodes from Batman: The Animated Series attached are:
 "Heart of Ice"
 "I Am the Night"
 "Legends of the Dark Knight"
 "Over the Edge"

The DVD was advertised as the "first animated Batman movie to be rated PG-13", but this is misleading. The unedited version of Batman Beyond: Return of the Joker (2000) was also rated PG-13.

A DVD (Blu-ray Disc for PlayStation 3) of the movie was bundled with the collectors edition of Batman: Arkham City, which was released on October 18, 2011.

A Blu-ray and DVD combo was also released paired with Volume One of the Batman: Black and White comic book series in 2015. Special features include the documentary Batman and Me: The Bob Kane Story, the A Mirror for the Bat featurette and the audio commentary of the film by Gregory Noveck, Dennis O'Neil and Kevin Conroy.

Novelization
Comic book veteran Louise Simonson wrote a novel adaptation of the feature, published by Ace Books. It was released on May 27, 2008.  . Reviews for the novelization have been positive.

References in Batman-related media
The Batsuit from Field Test appears as an unlockable alternate skin under the name Anime Batman Skin in Batman: Arkham Knight. It was originally unlockable by linking a WBPlay account to the game; in December 2020, it was made freely available. Its description in the game itself reads "Field-Tested".

References

External links

The Official Widget.
DC page

 

Batman: Gotham Knight at The World's Finest

2008 films
2000s English-language films
2008 animated films
2008 anime films
2008 direct-to-video films
2008 action thriller films
2000s American animated films
2000s animated superhero films
American action thriller films
American anthology films
Animated Batman films
Anime-influenced Western animation
Bee Train Production
DC Universe Animated Original Movies
Direct-to-video animated films based on DC Comics
Direct-to-video interquel films
Films directed by Bruce Timm
Films directed by Toshi Hiruma
Films scored by Kevin Manthei
Madhouse (company)
Animated anthology films
Production I.G
Studio 4°C
Superheroes in anime and manga
The Dark Knight Trilogy
Toonami
Warner Bros. direct-to-video animated films
Films with screenplays by Alan Burnett
Japanese anthology films
Anime films based on comics